In mathematics, a subsequence of a given sequence is a sequence that can be derived from the given sequence by deleting some or no elements without changing the order of the remaining elements. For example, the sequence  is a subsequence of  obtained after removal of elements   and  The relation of one sequence being the subsequence of another is a preorder.

Subsequences can contain consecutive elements which were not consecutive in the original sequence. The substring is a refinement of the subsequence.

The list of all subsequences for the word "apple" would be "a", "ap", "al", "ae", "app", "apl", "ape", "ale", "appl", "appe", "aple", "apple", "p", "pp", "pl", "pe", "ppl", "ppe", "ple", "pple", "l", "le", "e", "" (empty string).

Common subsequence 

This would  be the longest common subsequence, since  only has length 3, and the common subsequence  has length 4.

Applications 

Subsequences have applications to computer science, especially in the discipline of bioinformatics, where computers are used to compare, analyze, and store DNA, RNA, and protein sequences.

Take two sequences of DNA containing 37 elements, say:

SEQ1 = ACGGTGTCGTGCTATGCTGATGCTGACTTATATGCTA
SEQ2 = CGTTCGGCTATCGTACGTTCTATTCTATGATTTCTAA

The longest common subsequence of sequences 1 and 2 is:

LCS(SEQ1,SEQ2) = CGTTCGGCTATGCTTCTACTTATTCTA

This can be illustrated by highlighting the 27 elements of the longest common subsequence into the initial sequences:

SEQ1 = AGGTGAGGAG
SEQ2 = CTAGTTAGTA

Another way to show this is to align the two sequences, that is, to position elements of the longest common subsequence in a same column (indicated by the vertical bar) and to introduce a special character (here, a dash) for padding of arisen empty subsequences:
SEQ1 = ACGGTGTCGTGCTAT-G--C-TGATGCTGA--CT-T-ATATG-CTA-
        | || ||| ||||| |  | |  | || |  || | || |  ||| 
SEQ2 = -C-GT-TCG-GCTATCGTACGT--T-CT-ATTCTATGAT-T-TCTAA

Subsequences are used to determine how similar the two strands of DNA are, using the DNA bases: adenine, guanine, cytosine and thymine.

Theorems 

 Every infinite sequence of real numbers has an infinite monotone subsequence (This is a lemma used in the proof of the Bolzano–Weierstrass theorem).
 Every infinite bounded sequence in  has a convergent subsequence (This is the Bolzano–Weierstrass theorem).
 For all integers  and  every finite sequence of length at least  contains a monotonically increasing subsequence of length   a monotonically decreasing subsequence of length  (This is the Erdős–Szekeres theorem).

See also

Notes 

Elementary mathematics
Sequences and series